GERB (acronym for Citizens for European Development of Bulgaria), (Bulgarian: Граждани за европейско развитие на Бъʌгария) is a conservative, populist political party which was the ruling party of Bulgaria between 2009 and 2021.

History 
GERB is headed by former Prime Minister of Bulgaria Boyko Borisov, the former mayor of Sofia, former member of the National Movement Simeon II and former personal guard of Todor Zhivkov in the 1990s. The establishment of the party followed the creation of a non-profit organization with the acronym (in Bulgarian) GERB — Citizens for European Development of Bulgaria, earlier the same year.

In early January 2007, and early February 2007, the party came second in public polls on party support with around 14%, trailing the Bulgarian Socialist Party which had around 25%. Its stated priorities are fighting crime and corruption, preserving family as the cornerstone of society and achieving energy independence.

GERB won the 2009 European Parliament election in Bulgaria with 24.36% of the vote. The party elected five MEPs and joined the European People's Party-European Democrats Group in the European Parliament (in the EPP section). On June 6, 2007, GERB applied formally to join as a member-party the European People's Party and joined EPP on February 7, 2008.

GERB won the 2009 parliamentary elections, held a month after the European ballot, winning 39.7% of the popular vote and 116 seats (out of 240). After the elections, a new government was formed, led by Borisov, primarily with GERB members and with 5 independent ministers around Deputy Prime Minister Simeon Djankov. The reformist wing was responsible for some of the most significant legislative victories, including a Constitutional reform to ban tax increases. GERB's candidates for the 2011 presidential election, Rosen Plevneliev and Margarita Popova (presidential nominee and running mate, respectively), won the elections on the second ballot with 52.6% of the popular vote.

On 20 February 2013, the government resigned after nationwide protests demanding it to step down. GERB won the 2013 parliamentary elections with 97 seats, receiving 30.5% of the popular vote. This made GERB the first governing party to be re-elected in the history of the post-communist Bulgaria. However, with lack of support from the other parties and designated to form a new government, Borisov refused the offer and so GERB went into opposition. However, due to the collapse of the coalition government in 2014 due to a new, even bigger wave of mass protests, GERB backed into power after the snap elections.

In 2020 GERB suffered a split, as a sizable number of members and local party organizations left alongside former second-in-command Tsvetan Tsvetanov to form the Republicans for Bulgaria party. The whole second half of 2020 saw mass protests against the GERB government, but nevertheless, Borsisov did not resign.

In the April 2021 parliamentary election GERB was first with 26.18% of the vote. In the July 2021 snap election, former Prime Minister Boyko Borisov's GERB-led coalition was the second with 23.51 percent of the vote. The next snap election was in November same year, Kiril Petkov's coalition emerged as surprise victors over the conservative GERB party, which dominated Bulgarian politics in the last decade. GERB has been in opposition since December 2021 until June 2022 - the fall of Petkov's government.

List of chairmen

Parliamentary leaders

Electoral history

National Assembly

Presidential

European Parliament

References

External links
Official website 

 
Political parties established in 2006
2006 establishments in Bulgaria
Conservative parties